Eugene Grant may refer to:
 Eugene M. Grant, American real estate investor, philanthropist and civic leader
 Eugene L. Grant, American civil engineer and educator